Events from the year 1874 in Scotland.

Incumbents

Law officers 
 Lord Advocate – George Young until February; then Edward Strathearn Gordon
 Solicitor General for Scotland – Andrew Rutherfurd-Clark; then John Millar; then William Watson

Judiciary 
 Lord President of the Court of Session and Lord Justice General – Lord Glencorse
 Lord Justice Clerk – Lord Moncreiff

Events 
 17 January – Victoria Swing Bridge in Leith completed, the longest swing bridge in Britain at this date.
 27 January – Bo'ness Junction rail crash near Falkirk on the North British Railway: 16 killed in a collision.
 27 February – four crew of Stonehaven life-boat lost on service.
 5 March – in the general election, former Scottish coal miner Alexander Macdonald (Lib–Lab) is elected for the English seat of Stafford, among the first Members of Parliament from a working class background.
 21 March – the first ever final of the Scottish Cup is won by Queen's Park F.C. who beat Clydesdale 2–0.
 21 May – foundation stone of St Mary's Cathedral, Edinburgh (Episcopal) laid by Walter Montagu Douglas Scott, Duke of Buccleuch.
 28 July – the Sutherland and Caithness Railway is opened through to Wick and Thurso, completing the Highland Railway system to the far north and causing cessation of Britain's last mail coach.
 7 August – Church Patronage (Scotland) Act 1874 abolishes patronage in the appointment of ministers to the Church of Scotland.
 Bernera Riot: Islanders of Great Bernera successfully resist Clearances.
 Coulburn Lobnitz & Company establish the shipbuilding business that will become known as Lobnitz in Renfrew.
 Joseph Russell, Anderson Rodger and William Lithgow establish the shipbuilding business that will become Lithgows in Port Glasgow.
 W. B. Thompson establishes the business that will become the Caledon Shipbuilding & Engineering Company in Dundee.
 Broomhall Castle built.
 Association football teams Heart of Midlothian F.C. (in Edinburgh), Greenock Morton F.C. and Hamilton Academical F.C. are founded.

Births 
 20 February – Mary Garden, operatic soprano (died 1967)
 23 February – Hugh S. Roberton, choirmaster (died 1952)
 9 March – John Duncan Fergusson, artist (died 1961)
 9 June – Launceston Elliot, weightlifter, first British Olympic champion, born in British India (died 1930 in Australia)
 25 November – Lewis Spence, writer and folklorist (died 1955)

Deaths 
 24 January – Adam Black, publisher (born 1784)
 31 July – Cosmo Innes, lawyer and antiquary (born 1798)
 6 August – Patrick Fairbairn, minister and theologian (born 1805)

The arts
 11 August – Stirling Smith Museum and Art Gallery opens as The Smith Institute in Stirling under the bequest of painter Thomas Stuart Smith (died 1869).
 Sveinbjörn Sveinbjörnsson, resident in New Town, Edinburgh, writes the tune that becomes the national anthem of Iceland, "Lofsöngur".

See also 
 Timeline of Scottish history
 1874 in the United Kingdom

References 

 
Years of the 19th century in Scotland
Scotland
1870s in Scotland